Christian Zanési (born 22 May 1952) is a French composer.

Biography
Born in Lourdes, Zanési studied with Guy Maneveau and Marie-Françoise Lacaze at the Pau University (South of France) (1974–1975), and with Pierre Schaeffer and Guy Reibel at the Paris Conservatory (1976–1977).

In 1977 he joined the Groupe de Recherches Musicales (GRM). There, he learned and practised all the technical skills linked to sound, thanks to a wide range of experiences, productions and encounters.

He has initiated many projects in the field of radio, publications and musical events including: the Electromania radio show on France Musique, the festival Présences électronique and the CD box sets Archives GRM, Bernard Parmegiani, l’œuvre musicale, Luc Ferrari, l’œuvre électronique.

He currently is the artistic director of the Ina GRM.

Since the 1990s Christian Zanési has been composing from his home studio and drawing his inspiration from the poetic encounter with remarkable sounds.

In 2011, Christian Zanési took part in Jérémie Carboni's Musique(s) électronique(s) documentary on Electronic music.

Discography
 D'un jardin à l'autre (extrait)—Concert Imaginaire Ina C1000
 Stop! l'horizon/ Profil-Désir/—Courir INA C 2001
 Grand Bruit—Métamkine MKC  011
 Arkheion (Les mots de Stockhausen/ Les voix de Pierre Schaeffer)—INA E 5001 (Diapason d’or)
 Le paradoxe de la femme-poisson—INA K 198
 Contributions aux publications du C.M.G.—Koka Media M10 27 58 72
 Matin Brun—Radio France
 91/98/01—InaGRM/
 GRM EXPERIENCE—with Mika Vainio (Pan Sonic) and Christian Fennesz Signature Radio France/ GRM
 Magnetic Landscape—Koka Media
 Soixante-dix huit tours—Double Entendre 

Compilations
 Rough Trade Shops-Electronic 01 (2xCD, Comp)—Marseille—Mute Records Ltd
 Rough Trade Shops-Electronic 01 (12")—Marseille 2—Mute Records Ltd
 Concert Imaginaire-GRM—D'un Jardin à l'autre—INA-GRM
 Génériques Potentiels—Rebecca, Electro Jeu, ...—Cezame
 Klangwelten—Grand Bruit (Excerpt)—WERGO
 50 Ans De Musique Electroacoustique au Groupe de Recherches (2xCD)—Grand Bruit, Saphir, S...—Fondazione Teatro Massimo
 Archives GRM (5xCD + Box)—Sonal RATP—INA-GRM
 The Citizen Band Issue. Vibrö No.3—Audio Visage—Vibrö
 Shepherds Know How to Have the Best Wool (File, MP3, Mixed, 192)—Nostalgia—Ante-Rasa

Further reading
 Paland, Ralph. 2008. Zanési, Christian. 2nd Edition. Biographical encyclopedia. Supplementary volume, edited by Ludwig Finscher. Kassel, Stuttgart: Bärenreiter, Metzler. 1181–1182.

References

External links

 Artist page (en) + interview (fr)
 Biography (Larousse) (in French)
 Video extract

1952 births
Electroacoustic music composers
Experimental composers
People from Lourdes
French experimental musicians
French classical composers
French male classical composers
French electronic musicians
French record producers
French radio presenters
Living people
20th-century French musicians
20th-century French male musicians